The 1st Vietnam Film Festival was held from August 17 to August 28, 1970, in Hanoi, Vietnam, with the slogan "For the Fatherland - For the Socialism" (Vietnamese: "Vì Tổ quốc - Vì chủ nghĩa xã hội").

Event 
The first Vietnamese film festival was organized by the Ministry of Culture and Information, the Vietnam Cinema Department and the Vietnam Cinema Association. With the criterion "Summarizing the cinematic works of the 4-year period against the Americans to save the country from 1965 to 1969", the festival aimed to encourage the work of composing and honor the outstanding works of Vietnamese artists in cinema field.

The opening ceremony was held at the August Cinema Theater. When the festival flag along with the national flag were raised, the film contest begins. The judges, included many famous people in the film industry as well as other art fields, were divided into three juries: feature film, documentary/science film and children/animated film. Members whose films are in attendance will not participate in voting for that film.

The closing and awarding ceremony were held in Vietnam Museum of Revolution. Everyone was gathered, listening to the name of the award ceremony. Awards include Golden Lotus, Silver Lotus and Certificate of Merit, no individual awards yet. The Golden Lotus is designed like a coin, as big as the mouth of a tea cup, embossed with a golden lotus. From the jury to the award-winning artist, no one received any monetary remuneration as well as material gifts, only such symbolic medals. 29 Golden Lotuses were awarded to 3 feature films, 24 documentary films and 2 animated films.

Awards

Feature film

Documentary/Science film

Animated film

References 

Vietnam Film Festival
Vietnam Film Festival
1970 in Vietnam